The Irk Valley Junction rail crash occurred on 15 August 1953 at Collyhurst, just over a mile from Manchester Victoria station. At that point, the electrified line to Bury passes through Irk Valley Junction, so called because it lies on a viaduct above the River Irk. At 07:40 on the morning of 15 August 1953, the 07:20 electric train from Bury collided with the 07:36 steam passenger train to Bacup hauled by a Class 4P 2-6-4 tank engine. The leading electric coach struck and overturned the steam engine and smashed through the parapet wall. The front of the carriage fell  onto the bank of the river; the rear fell  into the shallow river itself. Nine passengers and the driver of the electric train were killed. The crash occurred on a Saturday; had it been a weekday, the casualties would likely have been far higher.

The investigation revealed that the causes of the accident were twofold. Firstly the electric train passed the home signal at danger. Analysing the previous 110 runnings of the 07:20 train showed that the signal in question had not once been at danger; moreover the distant signal was at caution on 101 occasions. The driver appeared to have therefore missed the home signal as it was always clear in the past, and ignored the distant signal as it was normally at caution anyway and was normally cleared by the time he reached it.

The signalman was also at fault for not checking that the electric train had stopped before allowing the steam train through. The absolute block system was in place, but was not being operated in accordance with the regulations.  An analysis of the records revealed that the signal boxes in this area had frequently operated outside the guidelines, although until the fateful morning without serious consequence.

Sources
Ministry of Transport official accident report

External links
Image of fallen carriage
Pathe newsreel report on the accident

Railway accidents and incidents in Greater Manchester
Railway accidents in 1953
1953 in England
History of Manchester
Railway accidents involving a signal passed at danger
Accidents and incidents involving British Rail
August 1953 events in the  United Kingdom
Train collisions in England
1953 disasters in the United Kingdom
Rail accidents caused by a driver's error
Railway accidents caused by signaller's error
1950s in Manchester